The 2011 British GP2 round was a GP2 Series motor race held on 9 and 10 July 2011 at Silverstone Circuit in Silverstone, United Kingdom. It was the fifth round of the 2011 GP2 Season. The race supported the 2011 British Grand Prix.

Classification

Qualifying

Notes
 – Grosjean was given a ten grid position penalty after Valencia Sprint Race for causing a collision.
 – Mirocha did not take part in the qualifying session and did not continue the race weekend due to a pre-existing shoulder injury.

Feature Race

Notes
 – Palmer was given a 30 seconds time penalty, having forced Gutiérrez off the track.

Sprint Race

Standings after the round

Drivers' Championship standings

Teams' Championship standings

 Note: Only the top five positions are included for both sets of standings.

See also 
 2011 British Grand Prix
 2011 Silverstone GP3 Series round

References

External links
GP2 Series official website: Results

Silverstone
GP2 Silverstone
Silverstone GP2